A genie, or jinn, is a supernatural creature in early pre-Islamic Arabian and later Islamic mythology and theology.

Genie may also refer to:

Arts and entertainment
Genies in popular culture

Fictional characters
 Genie (Disney), a character in Disney's Aladdin series
 Genie, a character in Advanced Dungeons & Dragons 2nd edition

Gaming

 Genie (pinball), pinball machine 
 Game Genie, a series of video game cheat systems
 Genie Engine, a game engine

Music 
 "Genie" (Girls' Generation song), 2009
 "Genie" (YoungBoy Never Broke Again song), 2018
"Genie", a song by Marillion from the 2004 album Marbles
 "Genie", a song by Spice from the 2018 mixtape Captured
 "The Genie", a song by Snoop Doggy Dogg from the 2009 album Death Row: The Lost Sessions Vol. 1
  The Genie (Rockwell album), a 1986 studio album by singer-songwriter Rockwell

Businesses
 GEnie, a former online service by General Electric 
 The Genie Company, an American garage door manufacturer
 Genie Energy, an American energy company
 Genie Music, a South Korean company that produces and distributes music content
Genie Music Awards
 Genie (Terex), an American manufacturer of construction lift equipment

Military
 The Douglas AIR-2 Genie, an unguided air-to-air rocket with a nuclear warhead.

People
 Genie (feral child) (born 1957), the pseudonym of an American feral child
 Genie Bouchard (born 1994), Canadian tennis player
 Genie Chuo (born 1986), Taiwanese actor and singer
 Genie Chance (1927–1998), American journalist, radio broadcaster, and politician
 Genie Clark Pomeroy (1867–?), American writer and poet
 Genie Francis (born 1962), American actress
 Genie Z. Laborde (born 1928), American author, educator, video producer, and artist
 Genie Montalvo (born 1951), Puerto Rican actress, director, producer, and author
 Genie M. Smith (1852–?), American author and publisher
 Genie Pace, an American jazz and pop singer of the 1950s/60s
 Genie Sheppard (1863–1953), a British militant suffragette
 Genie, a professional wrestler from NWA All-Star Wrestling

Science and technology

 Genie (programming language), a general-purpose high-level programming language
 Genie Backup Manager, backup software for Windows
 Genie Workbench, a suite of film and TV production software
 Genie, a DirecTV digital video recorder 
 ALGOL 68 Genie, a programming language
 AIR-2 Genie, an American air-to-air nuclear rocket
 Diaper Genie, a diaper disposal system
 Project Genie, a 1964 computer project at UC Berkeley
 Tmall Genie, a smart speaker
 Video Genie, an early 1980s computer
 Colour Genie, from 1982

Other uses
 Genie Awards, Canadian film awards 1980–2012
 Genie, a name for synthetic cannabinoids

See also

 Djinn (disambiguation), including Djin
 Geni (disambiguation)
 Jeannie (disambiguation)
 I Dream of Jeannie, an American fantasy sitcom TV series
 Genie in the House, a British TV sitcom
 Jinn (disambiguation)
 Les Djinns (disambiguation)
 Jeannie, a genie character in I Dream of Jeannie 
 Winged genie, a motif in Iron Age art of Assyria
 "The Jean Genie", a song by David Bowie